General Beckett may refer to:

Charles Edward Beckett (1849–1925), British Army brigadier general 
Clifford Thomason Beckett (1891–1972), British Army major general
Edwin Beckett (1937–2018), British Army major general
John Beckett (American football) (1892–1981), U.S. Marine Corps brigadier general
Tom Beckett (born 1962), British Army lieutenant general
William Beckett (engineer) (1862–1956), British Army brigadier general